The Gibson Steps are an area of cliffs on the south coast of Australia, located at . The cliffs are the first sightseeing stopoff in Port Campbell National Park for travellers heading West along the Great Ocean Road, located about 2 minutes drive from The Twelve Apostles. The name Gibson Steps refers to the staircase leading down to the stretch of beach shown to the right.

See also
The Twelve Apostles, Victoria
London Arch (formerly London Bridge)
Loch Ard Gorge
The Grotto

Notes

External links

Official Website for 12 Apostles Region of Victoria
A detailed Travel Guide to the Great Ocean Road

Landforms of Victoria (Australia)
Stairways
Cliffs of Australia